In geometry, an apeirogonal antiprism  or infinite antiprism is the arithmetic limit of the family of antiprisms; it can be considered an infinite polyhedron or a tiling of the plane.

If the sides are equilateral triangles, it is a uniform tiling. In general, it can have two sets of alternating congruent isosceles triangles, surrounded by two half-planes.

Related tilings and polyhedra 
The apeirogonal antiprism is the arithmetic limit of the family of antiprisms sr{2, p} or p.3.3.3, as p tends to infinity, thereby turning the antiprism into a Euclidean tiling.

Similarly to the uniform polyhedra and the uniform tilings, eight uniform tilings may be based from the regular apeirogonal tiling. The rectified and cantellated forms are duplicated, and as two times infinity is also infinity, the truncated and omnitruncated forms are also duplicated, therefore reducing the number of unique forms to four: the apeirogonal tiling, the apeirogonal hosohedron, the apeirogonal prism, and the apeirogonal antiprism.

Notes

References 
 The Symmetries of Things 2008, John H. Conway, Heidi Burgiel, Chaim Goodman-Strass, 
 
 T. Gosset: On the Regular and Semi-Regular Figures in Space of n Dimensions, Messenger of Mathematics, Macmillan, 1900

Apeirogonal tilings
Euclidean tilings
Isogonal tilings
Prismatoid polyhedra